The Nokia Lumia 620 is an entry-level smartphone designed, developed and marketed by Nokia. It is the successor to the Lumia 610, and is one of the first Nokia phones to implement Windows Phone 8 alongside the Nokia Lumia 920 and Nokia Lumia 820. Although sharing a similar name with the Lumia 610, the Lumia 620 is a major overhaul over its predecessor, employing a 1.0 GHz dual-core processor. It also has exchangeable back covers which come in black, white, magenta, yellow, cyan etc.

It was announced in December 2012 and started selling in January 2013 in Asia, followed by Europe and the Middle East at an estimated street price of USD 249. In the United States, the Nokia Lumia 620 is available for AT&T's subsidiary brand Aio Wireless.

Like other Lumia devices with Windows Phone 8, Nokia adds these applications: HERE Drive+, HERE Maps, HERE City Lens, Nokia Mix Radio (select markets), Nokia Smartshoot, Nokia Cinemagraph. With subsequent Nokia Amber and Nokia Black updates, they added Nokia Camera, Nokia Glance, Glance Background, Storage Check, Data Sense and several other minor enhancements which were supplied by Microsoft as part of their general distribution release.

Because of the limited memory available on this phone, certain applications and features will not be able to run.

On July 23, 2013, a variant of the Nokia Lumia 620, the Nokia Lumia 625, was released with a bigger display, 4G support, faster processor, larger battery and 1080p video recording. However, this model lacks certain features like Nokia Glance and some sensors for which it lacks the ability to run applications including Nokia City Lens

Along with Lumia 810 and 928, this model will not get the FM Radio support upon updating to Windows Phone "Amber". Reasons range from the model not having the FM radio chip to the design of the casing (and earphone plug) not supporting the connection for the antenna required.

Specifications

Hardware
The Lumia 620 comes with a 3.8-inch capacitive touchscreen LCD display. It is powered by a dual-core 1.0 GHz Krait Qualcomm Snapdragon S4 processor and has 512 MB of RAM. The phone has 8 GB of internal storage that can be expanded using MicroSD cards up to 64 GB.

The Lumia 620 has a 1300 mAh Li-Ion battery, 5-megapixel rear camera and VGA front-facing camera. It is available in lime green, orange, magenta, yellow, cyan, white and black.

Software
The Lumia 620 comes with Windows Phone 8 and is upgradeable to Windows Phone 8.1.

Reception
Engadget reviewed the phone very positively. It praised its battery life, performance, and value for money. It noted that the camera was not very good, but okay considering that the 620 is a budget phone.

James Rogerson of TechRadar in his review wrote: "There's not a whole lot that the Nokia Lumia 620 does wrong. As an all-round, jack of all trades budget handset it does a great job. We'd love it if the screen was slightly bigger or it had a little bit more RAM, but for the price we can't really complain. The only real issue is the battery, and that's an issue to some extent with every Windows Phone 8 right now."

See also 

 Microsoft Lumia

References

External links
 
 
 Video test from Nokia Lumia 620 using Nokia Camera App

Microsoft Lumia
Windows Phone devices
Mobile phones introduced in 2012
Discontinued smartphones
Videotelephony
Nokia smartphones
Mobile phones with user-replaceable battery